Blaylock is a family name which may have originated in north-west England and Scotland. People with this family name include:

 Anthony Blaylock (born 1965), American football cornerback
 Audie Blaylock (born 1962), American bluegrass musician
 Bob Blaylock (born 1935), American baseball pitcher
 Cheryl Blaylock (born 1953), American puppeteer, actress and comedian
 Chet Blaylock (1924–1996), American politician
 Derrick Blaylock (born 1979), American football running back
 Gary Blaylock (born 1931), American baseball pitcher
 James Blaylock (born 1950), American fantasy author
 Jeannie Blaylock, American TV news anchor
 Josh Blaylock (born 1990), American actor
 Len E. Blaylock (1918–2012), American farmer, educator, small businessman and politician
 Louis Blaylock (1849–1932), American publisher, civil leader and mayor of Dallas, Texas
 Marv Blaylock (1929-1993), American baseball first baseman
 Mattie Blaylock (Celia Ann Blaylock) (1850–1888), American prostitute, companion of Wyatt Earp
 Mookie Blaylock (born 1967), American basketball player
 Robert Blaylock (Hubbard) (born 1979), Musician
 Ron Blaylock (born 1939), American football coach
 Russell Blaylock (born 1945), American neurosurgeon, author, lecturer, and newsletter editor
 Selwyn G. Blaylock (1879–1945), Canadian metallurgist and mining company president

See also
Blaylock Sandstone, geological formation in Arkansas and Oklahoma
Blalock (surname)
Blelloch (surname)

References